Tetratricopeptide repeat 39A is a human protein encoded by the TTC39A gene. TTC39A is also known as DEME-6 (differentially expressed in MCF7 with estradiol protein 6), KIAA0452, and c1orf34. The function of TTC39A is currently not well understood. The main feature within tetratricopeptide repeat 39A is the domain of unknown function 3808 (DUF3808), spanning almost the entire protein.  KIAA0452 can also be seen as an isoform of TTC39A because of differences in genome sequence, but overlap in DUF domain.

Gene 

The gene for TTC39A is located on the first chromosome at 1p32.3. The genomic DNA is 57,859 bases long, consists of 19 exons and is located on the minus strand. The mRNA has a length of 2759 bases. TTC39A is surrounded by genes for RNF11 and EPS15. Neither of these genes have a known interaction or similar function as TTC39A. There are not any known medical disorders resulting from the deletion of TTC39A.

The gene for KIAA0452 is also located on the first chromosome at 1p32.3.  The genomic DNA is 34,096 bases long, consists of 11 exons   and is located on the minus strand.  The mRNA has a length of 6256 bases.

Homology 

TTC39A has several orthologs that have been found in eukaryotes, archea, and bacteria. Two paralogs, TTC39B and TTC39C, have also been identified. The functions of TTC39B and TTC39C are not known.

KIAA0452  has several similar orthologs as TTC39A from eukaryotes, achea and bacteria but different protein identities and similarities.

mRNA features

Promoter 
The predicted promoter for the TTC39A gene spans 713 bp from 51,796,048 to 51,796,760.

A predicted promoter for KIAA0452 gene spans 600 bp from 51,796,517 to 51,797,117.

Transcription factors 
Below are some of transcription factors that exist for the predicted the promoter sequence.

Below are some of transcription factors, with similarity of 1, that exist for the predicted promoter sequence.

Protein 

The longest protein sequence consists of 613 amino acids. Within TTC39A, there is a domain of unknown function, DUF 3808. DUF 3808 is generally considered to be an outer mitochondrial membrane protein and has been conserved from fungi to humans. DUF 3808 also contains a tetratricopeptide, TPR_16 and a predicted transmembrane domain. The structure of TTC39A is predicted to have 12 alpha helices and a single beta sheet.

KIAA0452 has a protein sequence with 453 amino acids.  The structure of KIAA0452 is predicted to have 11 alpha helices and 9 beta sheets. KIAA0452 overlaps TTC39A via a domain of unknown function, DUF 3808.  KIAA0452 has a predicted molecular weight of 49.4 kdal  and an isoelectric point of 6.766000.

Expression 

There are 17 splice variants for TTC39A. TTC39A is a highly expressed protein in the human body. The highest levels of expression are located in mammary glands and testis. The lowest levels of expression are found in the immune system.

KIAA0452 expression is most prevalent in the brain, with the highest levels in the trigeminal ganglion and occipital lobe

TTC39A is induced by TFAP2C in hormone responsive breast carcinoma cells and TTC39A is expressed in estrogen receptor positive carcinoma cell lines.

Post translational modifications 
There are several predicted phosphorylation sites but none have been experimentally confirmed. A single sulfination site is predicted at position 175.

KIAA0452 has a single N-acetalation site at position 274.

Interactions 
TTC39A has been found to interact with BTNL2 and MAPK3.

References